The 2009 Mackay Cutters season was the second in the club's history. Coached by Shane Muspratt and captained by Jardine Bobongie, they competed in the QRL's Wizard Cup. The club finished the season in 14th, last place, winning the wooden spoon.

Season summary 
The 2009 season started strongly for the Cutters, with three straight wins before a run of nine straight losses sunk them to the bottom of the table. A 10–34 loss to the Tweed Heads Seagulls in the final game of the regular season saw them finish last on points differential. Local junior Jardine Bobongie joined the club in 2009 and won their Player of the Year award after spending the 2008 season playing for the St George Illawarra Dragons' New South Wales Cup side. He would go on to play an influential role in their maiden premiership four years later, captaining the side in the Grand Final victory. 2009 saw the Cutters have their first Queensland Residents representative, with North Queensland Cowboys contracted prop Dayne Weston being selected in the side.

Milestones 
 Round 3: The club recorded their sixth straight win, the club's longest winning streak.

Squad List

2009 squad 

The following players contracted to the North Queensland Cowboys played for the Cutters in 2009: Mitchell Achurch, Ben Farrar, Ben Harris, Shannon Hegarty, Antonio Kaufusi, Donald Malone, Anthony Perkins, Steve Rapira, Grant Rovelli, Anthony Watts and Dayne Weston.

Squad movement

Gains

Losses

Fixtures

Regular season

Statistics

Honours

Club 
 Player of the Year: Jardine Bobongie
 Sponsor's Player of the Year: Jardine Bobongie
 Rookie of the Year: Darren Griffiths
 Club Person of the Year: Tony Gambie

References 

2009 in Australian rugby league
2009 in rugby league by club
Mackay Cutters